The Auckland Savings Bank Building is an historic building located at 260 Queen Street, Auckland CBD. Built in 1884, the premises was formerly owned by the Auckland Savings Bank. In 1977, the building was acquired by the newly established McDonald's New Zealand and was converted into a fast food restaurant. It was the first McDonald's restaurant in Auckland and only the second in New Zealand (behind Porirua). Much of the facade and interior design have been renovated and preserved.

Architecture
Designed by Edward Bartley, the facade was inspired by Italian Renaissance palazzi, a style much used by commerce and banking during some eras. It is one of the few remaining buildings on Queen Street that is over a hundred years old.

References 

Buildings and structures in Auckland
Heritage New Zealand Category 1 historic places in the Auckland Region
Commercial buildings completed in 1884
1880s architecture in New Zealand
Auckland CBD